Below is a list of political societies at UK universities, in order of age, with links to the relevant Wikipedia articles for the more notable ones.

References

Pol
Student societies in the United Kingdom
Student political organizations
Student politics in the United Kingdom
Political
Student political societies